In mathematical representation theory, a Harish-Chandra homomorphism is a homomorphism from a subalgebra of the universal enveloping algebra of a semisimple Lie algebra to  the  universal enveloping algebra of a subalgebra. A particularly important special case is the Harish-Chandra isomorphism identifying the center of the universal enveloping algebra with the invariant polynomials on a Cartan subalgebra.

References

Representation theory of Lie groups